Evan Baker (born 1952) is an American opera historian.

Life and career
Baker received his PhD in Performance Studies from New York University in 1993.

He has published numerous scholarly studies on a range of topics in opera staging and production.

Selected bibliography
 (1990) The scene designs for the first performances of Bizet's Carmen
 (1992) Theaters in Vienna during Mozart's lifetime
 (1993) Alfred Roller's production of Mozart's Don Giovanni: a break in the scenic traditions of the Vienna Court Opera
 (1994) Das Archiv Alfred Roller 
(1998) Wagner in rehearsal, 1875–1876: the diaries of Richard Fricke by Richard Fricke and E. B.
 (1998) Leoncavallo in the United States and Canada in fall, 1906
 (1998) Nazionalismo e cosmopolitismo nell'opera fra '800 e '900: atti del 3o Convegno internazionale "Ruggero Leoncavallo nel suo tempo": Locarno, Biblioteca cantonale, 6-7 ottobre 1995 by Convegno internazionale di studi su Ruggero Leoncavallo 
 (2001) Arnold Schönberg als Regisseur?: "Erwartung" und "Die glückliche Hand" an der Krolloper
 (2013) From the Score to the Stage: An Illustrated History of Continental Opera Production and Staging (Chicago 2013)

References

External links
Homepage

Evan Baker

American musicologists
Tisch School of the Arts alumni
Mozart scholars
Living people
1952 births